"Sleep When I'm Dead" is a single by the British band The Cure released on 13 July 2008 on Geffen Records in the United Kingdom. It was pushed back to 15 July in the United States to comply with the tradition of releasing songs on a Tuesday. It has the distinction of including a keyboard part despite the fact that the band has not had a keyboardist in their lineup since 2005, although "The Only One" and "NY Trip" feature piano parts.

Robert Smith told Rolling Stone the song was originally written during sessions for the band's 1985 album The Head on the Door and had the working title of "Kat 8."

Track listing
"Sleep When I'm Dead (Mix 13)" – 3:51
"Down Under" – 3:05

Written by Cooper/Gallup/Smith/Thompson

Charts

References

The Cure songs
2008 singles
Songs written by Robert Smith (musician)
Songs written by Simon Gallup
Songs written by Jason Cooper
Songs written by Porl Thompson
2008 songs
Geffen Records singles
Number-one singles in Spain